Johann von Türckheim (10 November 1749 – 28 January 1824) was a French politician and a German diplomat.

Family
Jean de Turckheim was the oldest son of Baron Jean de Turckheim (1707–1793) and a brother of Bernard-Frédéric de Turckheim. His nephew, Jean-Frédéric de Turckheim, was the eighth mayor of Strasbourg.

Life
He was elected as a deputy of Strasbourg to the Estates-General in 1789. Initially supportive of the revolution, he became disenchanted with its goals after the violence of July and August 1790 and became convinced that the unrest was part of a broader plan to overthrow the king and establish a radical republic. After a short term as mayor of Strasbourg, he left France, and offered his services to the Duke of Hesse, whom he served for several years, in particular as envoy to Rome. He died in Altorf (Ettenheim), in the Grand Duchy of Baden in 1824.

Works
 De Jure legislatorio Merovaeorum et Carolingorum Galliae regum circa sacra. 1771, 1772
 History of the House of Hesse.

See also
 List of members of the National Constituent Assembly of 1789

References

Members of the National Constituent Assembly (France)
French people of German descent
1749 births
1824 deaths